Subtítulo is the sixth album by indie folk musician Josh Rouse.  Released in 2006, it was his first album for Nettwerk Records.

Track listing

 "Quiet Town" (Josh Rouse, Daniel Tashian) — 2:31
 "Summertime" (Josh Rouse) — 2:23
 "It Looks Like Love" (Josh Rouse) — 3:46
 "La Costa Blanca" (Josh Rouse) — 2:26
 "Jersey Clowns" (Josh Rouse) — 4:15
 "His Majesty Rides" (Josh Rouse) — 3:39
 "Givin' It Up" (Josh Rouse) — 3:31
 "Wonderful" (Josh Rouse) — 3:48
 "The Man Who... (featuring Paz Suay)" (Josh Rouse) — 3:43
 "El Otro Lado" (Josh Rouse) — 3:06
 "The Clear Coast (featuring Gary Louris)" — 3:36 (iTunes Bonus Track)

References

2006 albums
Josh Rouse albums